Orion is the 11th studio album by singer-songwriter Ryan Adams, released on May 18, 2010, on Adams' own record label PAX AM. Described as Adams' first "fully-realized sci-fi metal concept album," Orion was released on a limited vinyl run, and could only be purchased from the PAX AM online store. There are no plans for a wide release, but as of November 4, 2010, Adams' new site paxamrecords.com is offering a standard edition vinyl that will also include the download card of the entire album. Those who purchased the album in its limited run also received a bonus 7" single.

The album was recorded in 2006, while working on Easy Tiger with producer Jamie Candiloro, and is Adams' first full-length album release since splitting from The Cardinals in March 2009.

Orion'''s artwork was designed by Michel Langevin of Voivod.

Influences
On the popular Ryan Adams forum, Ryan Adams Archive, Adams posted the following regarding Orion'''s stylistic influences:

Track listing

Personnel
 Ryan Adams – vocals and guitars
 Jamie Candiloro – drums and synths
 Dale Nixon – bass

References

2010 albums
Ryan Adams albums
PAX AM albums

hr:Orion
no:Orion